The 1956–57 Hellenic Football League season was the fourth in the history of the Hellenic Football League, a football competition in England. It also was the first season for the league to consist of two divisions after ten new clubs joined the league.

Premier Division

The Premier Division featured 15 clubs which competed in the division last season, along with two new clubs:
Bletchley & Wipac
Wantage Town, joined from the Swindon & District League

League table

Division One

The Division One featured 10 new clubs:
Amersham Town Reserves
Aylesbury Town Corinthians
Bletchley & Wipac Reserves
Luton Town Colts
Princes Risborough Town, relegated from the Hellenic League (single division)
R A F Halton
Ruislip Town
Staines Town Reserves
Stokenchurch Reserves
Thatcham, relegated from the Hellenic League (single division)

League table

References

External links
 Hellenic Football League

1956-57
H